"A Letter to Lord Ellenborough" is a pamphlet written in 1812 by Percy Bysshe Shelley in defence of Daniel Isaac Eaton. Printed in Barnstaple, the essay is approximately 4,000 words in length.

Arguments advanced in the essay
In the essay, Shelley argues for concepts which were then quite radical, including complete freedom of the press, and a tolerance for all published opinion, even when false. The latter, he argued, would "ultimately be controverted by its own falsehood."

The epigraph on the title page is by Tiberius from The Annals, Deorum Offensa, Diis curae. An offense to the gods is rectified by the gods.

A speech by the Marquess Wellesley from July 2 in the Globe is quoted.

In the Advertisement, Shelley wrote that he had waited for four months for someone to attack the sentence but when none was forthcoming, he wrote the letter.

Origin of the title

Lord Ellenborough
The title arises from the name of the letter's recipient, who directed the jury that convicted Eaton. Eaton had been tried and found guilty of "blasphemous libel", for being an atheist. At the trial before Edward Law, 1st Baron Ellenborough, the Lord Chief Justice of England, what Mark Sandy of the University of Durham has called a "prejudiced jury" convicted Eaton for printing part three of Thomas Paine's Age of Reason.

The trial
Daniel Eaton was put on trial in May 1812. During the trial, in which he was accused of being an atheist, as well as the aforementioned "blasphemous libel." In defending himself, Eaton claimed that his beliefs were not atheistic, but deistic. He attempted to argue that scripture was open to the type of critique that Paine had leveled in Age of Reason. He based this view on his belief that the god of the Old Testament was "a revengeful and primitive deity", while the Christ of the New Testament was "an exceedingly virtuous, good man, but nothing supernatural or divine."

Despite the paucity of evidence, on 15 May 1812, the Ellenborough-led jury found Eaton guilty. His sentence was severe, including eighteen months in Newgate Prison and a monthly pillorying for the entire term of his sentence.

Publication history
The letter was republished as Shelley on Blasphemy: Being His Letter to Lord Ellenborough, Occasioned by the Sentence which He Passed on Mr. D. I. Eaton in 1883 in London by the Progressive Publishing Company.

The letter was republished in A letter to Lord Ellenborough: Occasioned by the Sentence Which He Passed on Mr. D.I. Eaton as publisher of the third part of Paine's 'Age of Reason''' in 1894 in London by R. Forder.

References

Sources
Butler, Marilyn. Romantics, Rebels and Reactionaries: English Literature and its Background, 1760-1830. Oxford University Press, 1982.
Cameron, Kenneth Neill. "Shelley vs. Southey: New Light on an Old Quarrel." PMLA, Vol. 57, No. 2 (Jun., 1942), pp. 489–512.
Cameron, Kenneth Neill. "Shelley and the Reformers." ELH, Vol. 12, No. 1 (March, 1945), pp. 62–85.
Clark, David Lee. "The Dates and Sources of Shelley's Metaphysical, Moral, and Religious Essays." The University of Texas Studies in English, Vol. 28, (1949), pp. 160–194.
Grimes, Kyle. "'Queen Mab', the Law of Libel, and the Forms of Shelley's Politics." The Journal of English and Germanic Philology, Vol. 94, No. 1 (January, 1995), pp. 1–18.
Male, Roy R., Jr. "Young Shelley and the Ancient Moralists." Keats-Shelley Journal, Vol. 5, (Winter, 1956), pp. 81–86.
Shelley, Percy Bysshe. Shelley on Blasphemy: Being his Letter to Lord Ellenborough, occasioned by the sentence which he passed on Mr. D. I. Eaton, as publisher of the third part of Paine's "Age of Reason". London: Progressive Publishing Company, 1883.
Sotheran, Charles. Percy Bysshe Shelley as a Philosopher and Reformer. Boston, MA: IndyPublish.com, 2006. First published in New York by C.P. Somerby, 1876.
White, Newman I. "Literature and the Law of Libel: Shelley and the Radicals of 1840-1842." Studies in Philology, Vol. 22, No. 1 (January, 1925), pp. 34–47.
White, Newman I. "Shelley and the Active Radicals of the Early Nineteenth Century." South Atlantic Quarterly'', 29, 1930, pp. 246–261.

External links
A Letter to Lord Ellenborough. London: R. Forder, 1894.
"A Letter to Lord Ellenborough." Selected Prose Works of Shelley. London: Watts & Co., 1915.

1812 documents
Works by Percy Bysshe Shelley
Blasphemy
Freedom of the press